The 1985 French Grand Prix was a Formula One motor race held at Paul Ricard on 7 July 1985. It was the seventh race of the 1985 Formula One World Championship. It was the 63rd French Grand Prix and the ninth to be held at Paul Ricard.

The race was won by Brazilian driver Nelson Piquet, driving a Brabham-BMW. It was the 35th and final Formula One victory for the Brabham team, as well as the first F1 victory for Italian tyre manufacturer Pirelli since . Finn Keke Rosberg finished second in a Williams-Honda, having started from pole position, with local driver Alain Prost third in a McLaren-TAG. Prost moved to within five points of Drivers' Championship leader, Italian Michele Alboreto, who retired on lap 6 with a turbo failure in his Ferrari.

This was to be the last French Grand Prix held on the full Paul Ricard circuit until 2018. A shorter,  circuit would be used from 1986 until 1990, following Elio de Angelis's fatal accident during a test session in May 1986.

Qualifying report
Qualifying saw Keke Rosberg take pole position in his Williams-Honda with a time of 1:32.462, averaging , with Ayrton Senna alongside him on the front row in his Lotus-Renault. On the second row were Michele Alboreto in the Ferrari and Alain Prost in the McLaren, and on the third were Nelson Piquet in the Brabham and Niki Lauda in the second McLaren. Completing the top ten were Elio de Angelis in the second Lotus, Gerhard Berger in the Arrows, and the two factory Renaults of Patrick Tambay and Derek Warwick, Tambay driving a 'B' specification of the RE60.

The race was also the first in which the Tyrrell team used Renault turbo engines, thus becoming the last F1 team to go over from naturally aspirated engines to turbos. However, only Martin Brundle drove the new Renault-powered 014 car, while teammate Stefan Bellof continued to use the Cosworth-powered 012. Brundle could only qualify 20th, but was still over four seconds faster than Bellof in 25th.

Qualifying classification

Race report
At the start, Rosberg led away from Senna and Piquet, while Prost slipped to eighth. The early laps saw both Ligiers retire, Jacques Laffite suffering a turbo failure on lap 3 and Andrea de Cesaris dropping out with steering problems two laps later. Alboreto also suffered a turbo failure on lap 6 while running fourth.

On lap 7, Piquet overtook compatriot Senna on the Mistral Straight. He then closed up to Rosberg, who was struggling for grip, before passing him for the lead at Beausset on lap 11. At the same time, Lauda and Prost moved up to third and fourth respectively, ahead of de Angelis. On lap 21, Berger collided with the Minardi of Pierluigi Martini, putting both drivers out.

Senna, who had dropped down the order due to gearbox problems, retired in dramatic fashion on lap 27, when his engine failed and oil from it leaked onto his rear tyres, causing him to spin off backwards into the catch fencing and crash massively at Signes. He escaped with bruises, while his Lotus caught fire. Lauda retired on lap 31 when his own gearbox failed, promoting Prost to third; Brundle also suffered a gearbox failure on lap 33.

On lap 38, by which time Piquet had extended his lead to over 20 seconds, Prost overtook Rosberg for second at the Verrerie bends. The Finn promptly pitted for new tyres, emerging in fourth behind de Angelis. He then made a charge, quickly passing the Lotus and setting the fastest lap of the race on lap 46, before retaking second from Prost on the final lap.

Up front, Piquet cruised to victory, taking the chequered flag 6.6 seconds ahead of Rosberg. Prost finished 44 seconds ahead of the second Ferrari of Stefan Johansson, who passed de Angelis for fourth on the final lap, with Tambay taking the final point for sixth.

Race classification

Championship standings after the race

Drivers' Championship standings

Constructors' Championship standings

References

French Grand Prix
French Grand Prix
Grand Prix
French Grand Prix